The Measure (SA) were an American punk rock band formed in 2005 in New Brunswick, New Jersey  who released albums on Don Giovanni Records and No Idea Records. The (SA) in the name is for "Strictly Analog". They played their last shows in 2011 in New Brunswick and at The Fest 10 in Gainesville, Florida.

References

Don Giovanni Records artists
Musical groups established in 2005
New Brunswick, New Jersey
Pop punk groups from New Jersey